A gut is a narrow coastal body of water, a channel or strait, usually one that is subject to strong tidal currents flowing back and forth. The term is also used in some places for a small creek.

Coastal channels

Many guts are straits but some are at a river mouths where tidal currents are strong. The comparatively large quantities of water that flow quite quickly through a gut can cause heavy erosion that results in a channel deeper than the rest of the surrounding seabed, and the currents may present a hazard to ships and boats at times.

The term "gut" is primarily (though not exclusively) applied to channels of the coastal waters of the Atlantic coast of North America. A similar term of related but not identical meaning, "gat", is applied to some narrow waterways of the North Sea and Baltic Sea coasts of Europe.

Some bodies of water named "Gut" are:
Digby Gut in Nova Scotia
Mira Gut, at the confluence of the Mira River with the Atlantic Ocean at the settlement of Mira Gut, Nova Scotia
Gut of Canso in Nova Scotia
Big Gut at Pictou Landing, Nova Scotia
Shippagan Gut, separating Lamèque Island from the mainland in New Brunswick
The Gut, separating Rutherford Island from the mainland at South Bristol, Maine
Townsend Gut, separating Southport Island from the mainland at Southport, Maine
The Gut at Biddeford Pool in Maine
Hull Gut in Massachusetts
Shirley Gut in Massachusetts (now filled)
Sally's Gut, in Lake Winnipesaukee between Stonedam Island and the mainland
Plum Gut (site of the Plum Gut Lighthouse), separating Plum Island from Long Island in New York
Turtle Gut, site of the Battle of Turtle Gut Inlet in New Jersey (now filled)
The Wooly Gut, separating West Point Island from West Falkland in the Falkland Islands
The Gut of Gibraltar, an alternate and mostly archaic name for the Strait of Gibraltar

Many other channels in Canada are named "Gut". Applied to proper names, "gut" is sometimes used more broadly. For instance South Gut and North Gut at the settlement of South Gut St. Anns, Nova Scotia are just inlets, while Brewery Gut in England and The Gut in Ontario are fast-flowing stretches of river, Jigsaw Rock Gut in Antarctica is a gully, and Gardner's Gut in New Zealand is a cave system. Conversely, some guts are not so named, such as The Rip, a gut in Australia, where the term "gut" is not used.

Small creeks
Another meaning for "gut" in geography is a small creek, and this is seen in proper names in eastern North America from the Mid-Atlantic states (for instance, The Gut in Pennsylvania, Ash Gut in Delaware, and other streams) down into the Caribbean (for instance, Guinea Gut, Fish Bay Gut, Cob Gut, Battery Gut and other rivers and streams in the United States Virgin Islands, in Jamaica (Sandy Gut, Bens Gut River, White Gut River), and in many streams and creeks of the Dutch Caribbean).

See also
Tidal race

References

Coastal and oceanic landforms
Coastal geography